The Zenvo ST1 is a high performance sports car manufactured by Danish company Zenvo Automotive. It is the company's first model and is manufactured almost entirely by the hands of a small team of workers, with the exception of a CNC router.

Vehicle data

The Zenvo ST1 is a high performance sports car.

The ST1 is made entirely by hand with the exception of a high performance, 5 axis CNC router. The ST-1 comes equipped with keyless entry, satellite navigation, telescopic steering wheel adjustment and electrically adjustable leather racing seats.

The car has a list price of €660,000. The price for registering the car in Denmark is around DKK 16 million (€2,143,952) as a result of the country's high registration taxes; however, Zenvo is aiming at the export market only. Production is limited to 15 cars.

Design 

Zenvo claim the ST-1 is entirely a result of Danish design. The car was designed by Christian Brandt and Jesper Hermann. The carbon fibre body was made in Germany and many components such as gauges, gas tank, ABS brakes, traction control and airbags come from American or German made cars.

Appearances

Top Gear 
The Zenvo ST1 was critically panned by the British motoring program Top Gear after a series of unfortunate accidents during filming of a segment for the show, including the car catching fire after a cooling unit failure. Another car from the company eventually finished a complete timed lap of the (wet) Top Gear Test Track; the resulting time was worse than the time of a BMW M5, also on a wet track. Zenvo responded to Top Gear with a statement published on the Danish website Pro Street.

Copenhagen Historic Grand Prix 2015 
At this event, the Zenvo ST1 caught fire, forcing the driver to bail out as quickly as possible. Zenvo said the fire was caused by fuel line problems.

See also 

 List of production cars by power output

References

External links
Official website

Cars introduced in 2009
Rear mid-engine, rear-wheel-drive vehicles
Sports cars
2010s cars